The Michigan State University Museum most commonly referred to as the MSU Museum is Michigan State University's oldest museum formed in 1857. It is the state of Michigan's first Smithsonian Affiliate. It was formed to support the work of the university and is also known for hosting the Great Lakes Quilt Center.

History 
Past curators include J. Alan Holman.

Collections

Cultural and Historical Collections
The MSU museum Cultural and Historical Collections include Anthropology, Folklife and Cultural Heritage, and history.

Natural Science Collections
The MSU museum Natural Science Collections include Mammalogy, Ornithology, Herpetology, Ichthyology, and Vertebrate Paleontology.

Exhibitions 
The museum hosts exhibitions to highlight the collections and complementary programs and works some rotating some permanent spread over the three floors of the museum.

Exhibition Spaces 
 Habitat Hall – Various dioramas of North and Central America's environments and animals as well as dinosaurs and Jurassic dinosaur skeletons.
 Heritage Hall – Highlights the Great Lakes region's economic history.
 Hall of Animal Diversity – Highlights different animals and their adaptions to their habitats.
 Collections Connections – allows visitors to see some of the cultural artifacts and natural history specimens and show how these are stored to study and preserve for the future.
 Hall of Evolution – A timeline of fossils from the Cambrian Period to the Pleistocene Epoch.
 Second Floor Landing – Exploring biodiversity of things big and small. It includes a skeletons of an African Bush Elephant as well as an Asian Elephant and a skull of a Columbian mammoth.

Recent Exhibitions 
 1.5° Celsius – Explore the impact of climate on our planet.
 We All Live Downwind –
 Gameplay – Experience games developed at MSU's Games for Entertainment and Learning (GEL Lab).
 Science on a Sphere – A projection sphere of visualizations of Earth and other locations highlighting a variety of data visualizations an exhibit supported by the Michigan State University Federal Credit Union

Past Exhibitions 
 Kindred – featured Odawa arts and crafts including ceramics, basketry, and beadwork from the Waganakising Odawa aka Little Traverse Bay Bands of Odawa Indians.
 Michigan Barns: Timber-framed, Plank and Polebarn – featured in July 1, 2003 – July 31, 2003

See also 
Eli and Edythe Broad Art Museum another museum at Michigan State University.

External links

References 

University museums
Museums in East Lansing, Michigan